The Dock is a prominent feature of the graphical user interface of macOS. It is used to launch applications and to switch between running applications. The Dock is also a prominent feature of macOS's predecessor NeXTSTEP and OPENSTEP operating systems. The earliest known implementations of a dock are found in operating systems such as RISC OS and NeXTSTEP. iOS has its own version of the Dock for the iPhone and iPod Touch, as does iPadOS for the iPad.

Apple applied for a US patent for the design of the Dock in 1999 and was granted the patent in October 2008, nearly a decade later. Any application can be dragged and dropped onto the Dock to add it to the dock, and any application can be dragged from the dock to remove it, except for Finder and Trash, which are permanent fixtures as the leftmost and rightmost items (or highest and lowest items if the Dock is vertically oriented), respectively.

Overview 

In NeXTSTEP and OPENSTEP, the Dock is an application launcher that holds icons for frequently used programs. The icon for the Workspace Manager and the Recycler are always visible. The Dock indicates if a program is not running by showing an ellipsis below its icon. If the program is running, there isn't an ellipsis on the icon. In macOS, running applications have been variously identified by a small black triangle (Mac OS X 10.0-10.4) a blue-tinted luminous dot (Mac OS X 10.5-10.7), a horizontal light bar (OS X 10.8 and 10.9), and a simple black or white dot (OS X 10.10-present).

In macOS, however, the Dock is used as a repository for any program or file in the operating system. It can hold any number of items and resizes them dynamically to fit while using magnification to better view smaller items. By default, it appears on the bottom edge of the screen, but it can also instead be placed on the left or right edges of the screen if the user wishes. Applications that do not normally keep icons in the Dock will still appear there when running and remain until they are quit. These features are unlike those of the dock in the NeXT operating systems where the capacity of the Dock is dependent on display resolution. This may be an attempt to recover some Shelf functionality since macOS inherits no other such technology from NeXTSTEP. (Minimal Shelf functionality has been implemented in the Finder.)

The changes to the dock bring its functionality also close to that of Apple's Newton OS Button Bar, as found in the MessagePad 2x00 series and the likes. Applications could be dragged in and out of the Extras Drawer, a Finder-like app, onto the bar. Also, when the screen was put into landscape mode, the user could choose to position the Button Bar at the right or left  side of the screen, just like the Dock in macOS.

The macOS Dock also has extended menus that control applications without making them visible on screen. On most applications it has simple options such as Quit, Keep In Dock, Remove From Dock, and other options, though some applications use these menus for other purposes, such as iTunes, which uses this menu as a way for a user to control certain playback options. Other Applications include changing the status of an online alias (MSN, AIM/iChat etc.) or automatically saving the changes that have been made in a document (There is no current application with this feature made available for macOS). Docklings (in Mac OS X 10.4 or earlier) can also be opened by using the right-mouse button, if the mouse has one, but most of the time either clicking and holding or control-click will bring the menu up.

In Mac OS X Leopard, docklings were replaced by Stacks. Stacks "stack" files into a small organized folder on the Dock, and they can be opened by left-clicking.
Stacks could be shown in three ways: a "fan", a "grid", or a "list", which is similar to docklings.  In grid view, the folders in that stack can be opened directly in that stack without the need to open Finder.

In iOS, the dock is used to store applications and, since iOS 4, folders containing applications. Unlike the macOS dock, a maximum of 4 icons can be placed in the dock on the iPhone and the iPod Touch. The maximum for the iPad however is 16 icons (13 apps and 3 recently opened apps). The size of the dock on iOS cannot be changed.

When an application on the Dock is launched by clicking on it, it will jump until the software is finished loading. Additionally, when an application requires attention from a user, it will jump even higher until its icon is clicked and the user attends to its demands.

Design 

The original version of the dock, found in Mac OS X Public Beta to 10.0, presents a flat white translucent interface with the Aqua styled pinstripes. The dock found in Mac OS X 10.1 to 10.4 removes the pinstripes, but otherwise is identical. Mac OS X 10.5 to 10.7 presents the applications on a three-dimensional glassy surface from a perspective instead of the traditional flat one, resembling Sun Microsystems' Project Looking Glass application dock. OS X 10.8 to 10.9 changes the look to resemble frosted glass with rounded corners. OS X 10.10 and later revert to a two-dimensional appearance, similar to Mac OS X 10.4, although more translucent and with a iOS 7 blur effect.

In iPhone OS 1 to 3, the dock used a metal look which looks similar to the front of the Power Mac G5 (2003-2005) and Mac Pro(2006-2012 or 2019-). iPhone OS 3.2 for iPad and iOS 4 to 6 adopted the dock design from Mac OS X 10.5 to 10.7 which was used until iOS 7, which uses a similar dock from Mac OS X Tiger but with iOS 7 styled blur effects. In iOS 11, the dock for the iPad and iPhone X is redesigned to more resemble the macOS dock.

Related software

The classic Mac OS does have a dock-like application called Launcher, which was first introduced with Macintosh Performa models in 1993 and later included as part of System 7.5.1.  It performs the same basic function. Also, add-ons such as DragThing added a dock for users of earlier versions.

MacOS was not the first operating system to implement dock-like features. RISC OS contains a feature called the Icon bar, which is remarkably similar to the macOS Dock. The Icon Bar was first implemented in 1987 for the first version of RISC OS, named Arthur.

Microsoft implemented a simplified dock feature in Windows 98 with the Quick Launch toolbar and this feature remained until Windows 7, where it was replaced by the Superbar, which implements functionality similar to the macOS Dock.

Various docks are also used in Linux and BSD. Some examples are Window Maker (which emulates the look and feel of the NeXTstep GUI), Docky, and Avant Window Navigator, KXDocker (amongst others) for KDE and various other gdesklet/adesklets docks, AfterStep's Wharf (a derivation from the NeXTstep UI),  iTask NG (a module used with some Enlightenment-based Linux distributions such as gOS) and Blackbox's Slit.

Criticism
Bruce Tognazzini, a usability consultant who worked for Apple in the 1980s and 1990s before Mac OS X was developed, wrote an article in 2001 listing ten problems he saw with the Dock. This article was updated in 2004, removing two of the original criticisms and adding a new one. One of his concerns was that the Dock uses too much screen space. Another was that icons only show their labels when the pointer hovers over them, so similar-looking folders, files, and windows are difficult to distinguish. Tognazzini also criticized the fact that when icons are dragged out of the Dock, they vanish with no easy way to get them back; he called this behavior "object annihilation".

John Siracusa, writing for Ars Technica, also pointed out some issues with the Dock around the releases of Mac OS X Public Beta in 2000. He noted that because the Dock is centered, adding and removing icons changes the location of the other icons. In a review of Mac OS X v10.0 the following year, he also noted that the Dock does far too many tasks than it should for optimum ease-of-use, including launching apps, switching apps, opening files, and holding minimized windows. Siracusa further criticized the Dock after the release of Mac OS X v10.5, noting that it was made less usable for the sake of eye-candy. Siracusa criticized the 3D look and reflections, the faint blue indicator for open applications, and less distinguishable files and folders.

Thom Holwerda, a managing editor OSNews, stated some concerns with the Dock, including the facts that it grows in both directions, holds the Trash icon, and has no persistent labels. Holwerda also criticized the revised Dock appearance in Mac OS X v10.5.

See also 
 Taskbar

References 

Application launchers
NeXT
Graphical user interface elements